Lam Wan Kit (born 25 November 1987 in Hong Kong) is a Hong Kong footballer who plays for Hong Kong First Division club Central & Western.

Career
Lam signed his first professional contract at age 19 with Sun Hei in 2006. Due to his need to balance his part time work and football life, he did train enough to show improvement as a player and was not retained the following season.

In 2012, Lam returned to Sun Hei, making 10 appearances for the club. However, at the conclusion of the 2013-14 season, Sun Hei declined to join the new fully professional Hong Kong Premier League leaving Lam without a contract for the following season.

After a brief stint with Sun Source at the start of the 2014-15 season, Lam spent the remainder of the campaign with Double Flower where he made 22 league appearances for the club.

The following season, Lam signed with Eastern District where he helped the club to reach promotion after a runners-up finish in the 2015-16 Second Division table.

In a bid to return to the top flight, Lam went on trial with several new HKPL clubs during the summer of 2016. He eventually signed with R&F and made his debut on 18 September in a Senior Shield match against Biu Chun Glory Sky.

Ahead of the 2017-18 season, Lam moved to fellow HKPL club  Dreams. He made his debut on 31 December 2017 in a 2017–18 Hong Kong FA Cup first round loss to Lee Man.

References

External links
 Lam Wan Kit at HKFA
 

Living people
Association football midfielders
Hong Kong people
Hong Kong footballers
Hong Kong Premier League players
Sun Hei SC players
Double Flower FA players
R&F (Hong Kong) players
Dreams Sports Club players
1987 births